Digging Deep: Subterranea is a compilation album featuring solo performances from English rock singer Robert Plant, released on 2 October 2020. The songs were assembled as a companion to his podcast series Digging Deep with Robert Plant that explores the composition and recording of hits, album tracks, and previously unreleased songs throughout Plant's post-Led Zeppelin career.

New tracks 

 "Nothing Takes the Place of You" is a Toussaint McCall cover recorded for the 2013 film Winter in the Blood.
 "Too Much Alike" is a Charle Feathers cover recorded with Patty Griffin.
 Also featured is "Charlie Patton Highway (Turn It Up – Part 1)", a reworking of the song "Turn It Up" from Lullaby and... The Ceaseless Roar, planned for a follow-up album to Band of Joy.

Track listing
Disc one
"Rainbow"
"Hurting Kind"
"Shine It All Around"
"Ship of Fools"
"Nothing Takes the Place of You"
"Darkness, Darkness"
"Heaven Knows"
"In the Mood"
"Charlie Patton Highway (Turn It Up – Part 1)"
"New World"
"Like I Never Been Gone"
"I Believe"
"Dance with You Tonight"
"Satan Your Kingdom Must Come Down"
"Great Spirit" (Acoustic)

Disc 2
"Angel Dance"
"Takamba"
"Anniversary"
"Wreckless Love"
"White Clean & Neat"
"Silver Rider"
"Fat Lip"
"29 Palms"
"Last Time I Saw Her"
"Embrace Another Fall"
"Too Much Alike"
"Big Log"
"Falling in Love Again"
"Memory Song (Hello Hello)"
"Promised Land"

Personnel
 Robert Plant– Vocals
 Patty Griffin– Vocals on "Too Much Alike"
 The Strange Sensation : Instrumentation 
 The Sensational Space Shifters  : Instrumentation

Production
 Richard Evans – Design & art

Charts

References

External links
Plant's homepage

2020 compilation albums
Robert Plant compilation albums